This is a list of corrections agencies in the states of the United States.

State adult prison agencies
 Alabama Department of Corrections
 Alaska Department of Corrections
 Arizona Department of Corrections, Rehabilitation & Reentry
 Arkansas Department of Correction
 California Department of Corrections and Rehabilitation
 Colorado Department of Corrections
 Connecticut Department of Correction
 Delaware Department of Correction
 District of Columbia Department of Corrections
 Florida Department of Corrections
 Georgia Department of Corrections
 Hawaii Department of Public Safety
 Idaho Department of Correction
 Illinois Department of Corrections
 Indiana Department of Correction
 Iowa Department of Corrections
 Kansas Department of Corrections
 Kentucky Department of Corrections
 Louisiana Department of Public Safety & Corrections
 Maine Department of Corrections
 Maryland Department of Public Safety and Correctional Services
 Massachusetts Department of Correction
 Michigan Department of Corrections
 Minnesota Department of Corrections
 Mississippi Department of Corrections
 Missouri Department of Corrections
 Montana Department of Corrections
 Nebraska Department of Correctional Services
 Nevada Department of Corrections
 New Hampshire Department of Corrections
 New Jersey Department of Corrections
 New Mexico Corrections Department
 New York State Department of Corrections and Community Supervision
 North Carolina Department of Public Safety
 North Dakota Department of Corrections and Rehabilitation
 Ohio Department of Rehabilitation and Correction
 Oklahoma Department of Corrections
 Oregon Department of Corrections
 Pennsylvania Department of Corrections
 Rhode Island Department of Corrections
 South Carolina Department of Corrections
 South Dakota Department of Corrections
 Tennessee Department of Correction
 Texas Department of Criminal Justice
 Utah Department of Corrections
 Vermont Department of Corrections
 Virginia Department of Corrections
 Washington State Department of Corrections
 West Virginia Division of Corrections and Rehabilitation
 Wisconsin Department of Corrections
 Wyoming Department of Corrections

State juvenile prison agencies
 Florida Department of Juvenile Justice
 Georgia Department of Juvenile Justice
 Illinois Department of Juvenile Justice
 Kentucky Department of Juvenile Justice
 New Jersey Juvenile Justice Commission
 Ohio Department of Youth Services
 Massachusetts Department of Youth Services
 Minnesota Correctional Facility - Red Wing
 Rhode Island Department of Children, Youth & Families 
 Tennessee Department of Children's Services
 Texas Youth Commission
 Utah Division of Juvenile Justice Services

State parole/probation agencies
 Arkansas Department of Community Correction
 Tennessee Board of Parole

United States Territories
 American Samoa Department of Public Safety
 Guam Department of Corrections
 Northern Marianas Department of Corrections
 Puerto Rico Department of Corrections and Rehabilitation
 United States Virgin Islands Department of Justice

See also

 Law enforcement in the United States

 
Corrections